The 2011 Aylesbury Vale District Council election took place on 5 May 2011 to elect members of Aylesbury Vale District Council in Buckinghamshire, England.  The whole council was up for election and the Conservative Party stayed in overall control of the council.

Election result
The results saw the Conservatives retain control of the council after winning 37 of the 59 seats. Conservative cabinet member Huw Lewis lost in Buckingham North, but the party gained a seat in Aylesbury Central by 1 vote over Liberal Democrat mayor Graham Webster. The Liberal Democrats lost seats, dropping to 17 councillors, with the Liberal Democrat group leader Alan Sherwell being defeated in Bedgrove.

Both the UK Independence Party and the Labour party won 2 seats, while independent Peter Cooper retained his seat in Wingrave. For the UK Independence Party the 2 seats they won in Quarrendon were the first seats the party had ever won on the council, while Labour returned to the council for the first time in over 10 years after winning seats in Buckingham South and Southcourt.

|}

Ward results

By-elections between 2011 and 2015

Oakfield
A by-election was held in Oakfield on 3 October 2013 after the death of Liberal Democrat councillor Steve Patrick. The seat was held for the Liberal Democrats by Alison Harrison with a majority of 81 votes over UK Independence Party candidate  Philip Gomm.

Gatehouse
A by-election was held in Gatehouse on 11 December 2014 after the resignation of Liberal Democrat councillor Stuart Jarvis. The seat was held for the Liberal Democrats by Anders Christensen with a majority of 28 votes over UK Independence Party candidate Graham Cadle.

Southcourt
A by-election was held in Southcourt on 11 December 2014 after the resignation of Labour councillor Michael Beall. The seat was gained for the Liberal Democrats by Peter Agoro with a majority of 163 votes over UK Independence Party candidate Brian Adams.

References

2011 English local elections
20011
2010s in Buckinghamshire